The England women's cricket team toured the West Indies in October and November 2013. They first played in the 2013–14 West Indies Women T20 Tri-Series, against the West Indies and New Zealand, which was won by the West Indies. They then played the West Indies in three One Day Internationals, winning the series 2–0.

Tri-Series

Squads

Group stage

Final

WODI Series

Squads

1st ODI

2nd ODI

3rd ODI

See also
 2013–14 West Indies Women T20 Tri-Series

References

External links
England Women tour of West Indies 2013/14 from Cricinfo

International cricket competitions in 2013
2013 in women's cricket
Women's international cricket tours of the West Indies
England women's cricket team tours